Late Night Mash is a British satirical comedy broadcast on Dave, as a continuation of The Mash Report on BBC Two. It is hosted by Rachel Parris, formerly by Nish Kumar, and features an array of comedians satirising the week's news. First aired on 20 July 2017, it is a TV show spin-off of The Daily Mash, a satirical website.

History
In March 2017, the BBC announced that it had commissioned The Mash Report, a new satirical news show hosted by Nish Kumar. It also stars Ellie Taylor and Steve N Allen as newsreaders Susan Treharne and Tom Logan, who read the satirical headlines, featuring correspondents Nathan Muir (Jason Forbes) and Prof. Henry Brubaker (Greig Johnson). Rachel Parris is also on Mash to explain the things going on in the news with a humorous twist. Geoff Norcott, a conservative comedian, also features regularly.

In March 2021, the BBC cancelled the series "in order to make room for new comedy shows". On 28 July 2021, Dave announced that a new eight-part series called Late Night Mash would air in autumn of that year, with the main cast of The Mash Report returning in what Dave called a "continuation" of the BBC series. It began airing on 2 September.

On 28 October 2021, Nish Kumar revealed that he was stepping down as the host of Mash. On 20 May 2022, it was announced that Rachel Parris would take over from him as the show's new host. The sixth series premiered on 1 September 2022. On 10 March 2023, Dave announced it had cancelled the series.

Ratings

The first episode attracted an audience of 800,000, which is 20% less than usual for its timeslot. In February 2018, the British Comedy Guide said that the show had been recommissioned a third series after "modest" ratings on television, but was more popular on the BBC iPlayer and some clips had gone viral to a global audience online.

Episodes

Reception 
Reviewing it in 2017, Chortle regarded The Mash Report as a successful UK version of The Onion.

In July 2017, Michael Hogan of The Daily Telegraph gave The Mash Report four stars out of five and wrote, "People are fond of trotting out clichés about current world events being 'beyond parody' and 'the jokes writing themselves'. But no, parody still has a place and jokes do need to be written. This sharp new show did it rather well and was the most promising satirical arrival on our screens in a long time." In November 2018, the BBC's political presenter Andrew Neil described The Mash Report on Twitter as "self-satisfied, self-adulatory, unchallenged left-wing propaganda". Responding to a tweet about Geoff Norcott's appearances, he said it was "hardly balance" and would "never happen on a politics show". Neil characterised the series as a "pathetic imitation" of The Daily Show in the United States, describing the latter's former host Jon Stewart as "left-wing but also intelligent".

Writing in 2021 after its relaunch as Late Night Mash, Emily Baker of the i newspaper disagreed with both the accusations of bias against the series and the show's self-styling as anti-establishment, saying that "the content of the show is no different from anything you'd hear on Radio 4's News Quiz (which has been hosted by Kumar on multiple occasions)... Late Night Mash certainly isn't centrist, but it's no more left or right-wing than Have I Got News For You".

See also 
 The Day Today
 List of satirical television news programs

References

External links 
 
 
 
 Late Night Mash at Dave

2017 British television series debuts
2010s British satirical television series
2020s British satirical television series
BBC satirical television shows
English-language television shows
Improvisational television series
Television series by Banijay
Television series by Zeppotron
British television series revived after cancellation
Dave (TV channel) original programming